Kan'ichi or Kanichi (written: , ,  or ) is a masculine Japanese given name. Notable people with the name include:

, Japanese historian
, Japanese politician
, Imperial Japanese Navy officer
, Japanese Major General
, Japanese voice actor and comedian
, Japanese philosopher
, Japanese politician
, Japanese composer
, Japanese sumo wrestler
Kanichi Yamamoto (1879–1961), Japanese Bahá'í

Japanese masculine given names